Trevor Lynn Powis (born July 7, 1949) is a Canadian former professional ice hockey player. Powis played for several teams in the National Hockey League, World Hockey Association and the German Eishockey-Bundesliga between 1970 and 1983.

Playing career
Powis was born in Saskatoon, Saskatchewan, Canada. His brother is Geoff Powis, who also played professional ice hockey. He played junior ice hockey with the Melville Millionaires and the Moose Jaw Canucks. Choosing university, Powis attended the University of Denver, starting in 1968. After one year, he was drafted by the Montreal Canadiens, 68th overall in the NHL Amateur Draft.

Powis played one more season at Denver, then turned professional in 1970 with the Denver Spurs of the Western Hockey League. Powis played on season for the Canadiens' American Hockey League affiliate Nova Scotia Voyageurs before being traded to the Atlanta Flames. Powis played one season with the Flames' Omaha Knights affiliate, then was traded to the Chicago Black Hawks. Powis made his NHL debut in 1973 with the Black Hawks, and played 57 games in the 1973–74 season with the Black Hawks, recording 8 goals and 13 assists.

In 1974, Powis was claimed by the Kansas City Scouts in the 1974 Expansion Draft. He played the 1974–75 season for Kansas City, before being traded in the off-season to the St. Louis Blues. Powis did not play again in the NHL. After being waived by St. Louis, Powis signed with the Calgary Cowboys of the World Hockey Association. He would go on to also play with the Indianapolis Racers and the Winnipeg Jets. Powis was a member of the championship 1978 Jets team.

In 1978, Powis moved to Germany and played four seasons in the Eishockey-Bundesliga for Duisburger SC and EV Füssen. He finished his career with one season in the Italian League for Alleghe, retiring in 1983.

In total, Powis played 130 games in the National Hockey League, scoring 19 goals and 33 assists. He played 153 games in the World Hockey Association scoring 50 goals and 65 assists.

After retirement from ice hockey, Powis has worked in real estate in the Denver area.

Career statistics

Regular season and playoffs

External links
 

1949 births
Living people
Calgary Cowboys players
Canadian ice hockey centres
Chicago Blackhawks players
Denver Spurs players
EV Füssen players
Füchse Duisburg players
HC Alleghe players
Ice hockey people from Saskatchewan
Indianapolis Racers players
Kansas City Scouts players
Melville Millionaires players
Montreal Canadiens draft picks
Moose Jaw Canucks players
NCAA men's ice hockey national champions
Nova Scotia Voyageurs players
Omaha Knights (CHL) players
Providence Reds players
Sportspeople from Saskatoon
Winnipeg Jets (WHA) players